Mount Hebron, also known as Hebron, is an unincorporated community in Greene County, Alabama, United States.

History
Mount Hebron was named for the mountain mentioned in the Bible. A post office operated under the name Hebron from 1826 to 1833 and under the name Mount Hebron from 1837 to 1965.

References

Unincorporated communities in Greene County, Alabama
Unincorporated communities in Alabama